Christopher Kareem Hayes (born May 7, 1972) is a former American football defensive back in the National Football League (NFL) for the Green Bay Packers, the New York Jets, and the New England Patriots.  Hayes played college football at Washington State University.

He was drafted by the New York Jets in the 7th round (210th overall) of the 1996 NFL Draft.  He spent the first year of his 7-year professional career with the Green Bay Packers, playing in two games on the 1996 Super Bowl XXXI Champions. In 1997 he signed with the New York Jets and played there through the 2001 season. He signed with New England for his last season in 2002.

References 

1972 births
Living people
Sportspeople from San Bernardino, California
American football defensive backs
Washington State Cougars football players
Green Bay Packers players
New York Jets players
New England Patriots players